Vasudeva Kanva was the founder of the Kanva dynasty. He was originally an Amatya (minister) of last Shunga ruler Devabhuti. Vasudeva killed the last Shunga ruler and established Kanva dynasty. Bana's Harshacharita informs us that he came to power after the death of Devabhuti by a daughter of his slave woman disguised as his queen. He was succeeded by his son Bhumimitra.

Ascension to power
He was originally an Amatya (minister) of last Shunga ruler Devabhuti. Vasudeva killed the last Shunga ruler and established Kanva dynasty. Bana's Harshacharita informs us that he came to power after the death of Devabhuti by a daughter of his slave woman disguised as his queen.

Reign
He was a Vaishnavite (worhsipper of Lord Vishnu). Most of the taxes collected during his reign were used for temples. He was one of the famous patrons of arts. During his reign, the Indo-Greeks invaded, but he managed to keep his throne. He was succeeded by his son Bhumimitra.

See also
 Dushyanta
 Shakuntala
 Vishvamitra
 Menaka
 Kaushika

References

Citations

Sources

Further reading
Lahiri, Bela: Indigenous States of Northern India (circa 200 B.C. - 320 A.D.), University of Calcutta, 1974.

1st-century BC Indian monarchs